Novospassk is a rural locality (a selo) and the administrative center of Novosergeyevsky Selsoviet of Arkharinsky District, Amur Oblast, Russia. The population was 195 as of 2018. There are 6 streets.

Geography 
Novospassk is located on the left bak of the Bureya River, 63 km northwest of Arkhara (the district's administrative centre) by road. Domikan is the nearest rural locality.

References 

Rural localities in Arkharinsky District